The North Water may refer to:

 The North Water (novel), a 2016 novel by Ian McGuire.
 The North Water (miniseries) a television series based on the novel.